Lucy Elizabeth Drummond Sale-Barker, née Davies, known also by her first married name Lucy Villiers (1841–1892) was a British children's writer. She began her literary career with occasional articles for Dublin University Magazine and St James's Magazine, and about 1872 began to write regularly for children. Between 1874 and 1888 she published more than forty volumes for juvenile readers. Many of her stories were initially composed for her own children. Some of her publications bore such titles as Little Bright Eyes' Picture Book and Little Golden Locks' Story Book. She edited Little Wide-Awake, a magazine for children, from its commencement in 1874 until her death, and wrote the verses for Kate Greenaway's popular Birthday Book for Children (1880).

Life
Lucy Elizabeth Drummond Davies was a daughter of Francis Henry Davies, a Court of Chancery registrar who died aged 72 at Koblenz on 22 October 1863, and his wife, the author Lady Lucy Clementina Drummond de Melfort (1795–1879), a sister of George Drummond, 5th Earl of Perth (1807–1902), whose claim was admitted in 1848 and who was restored to the peerage in 1853. Lucy had an older brother and sister, of whom little is known.

In 1858 Lucy Davies married Lieutenant-Colonel James Villiers. Their children included a daughter, Clementina, later Mrs Thomas Dyer Edwards. However, Lieutenant-Colonel Villiers died of fever whilst in command of the 74th Highlanders at Ramdroog, India, on 10 May 1862, aged 38. On 10 August 1865 she married John Sale Barker, a barrister-at-law of Cadogan Place, who in 1879 was living at 22 Palace Gardens Terrace, Kensington.  Her mother later lived with them and died at their house.

Lucy Sale-Barker died 4 May 1892 at her home, Inglenook, 93 Lennard Road, Penge.

Works
 Lily's home in the country, 1875
 Little wide-awake: a story book for little children, 1876
 Lily's visit to grandmamma, 1876
 Lily's scrap-book, 1877
 Lily's screen, 1877
 Birds, beasts, and fishes, 1886
 Some editions of  “Little wide Awake” Edited by MRS. SALE BARKER
 Works by Lucy Sale Barker in Internet Archive – online

Descendants
By first husband
 Clementina Georgina Lucy Drummond Villiers (b. 1859; d 3 April 1947 Painswick, Gloucestershire as Clementina Edwards) md 10 January 1878 St. Mary Abbots Church, Kensington Thomas Dyer Edwardes, sometimes called Thomas Dyer-Edwardes, Jr (21 February 1847 – 2 February 1926 Naples; bur 6 March 1926 Prinknash Abbey), son and heir of Thomas Dyer Edwardes who died 1885. The couple survived the sinking of the RMS Titanic. Edwards became a Catholic in 1924.  Prinknash Abbey was given to the Benedictine order, according to his wishes, by his widow Clementina.
 (Lucy) Noel (Martha) Dyer Edwards (b. 25 December 1878; – 12 September 1956) md 19 April 1900 John Norman Leslie, Earl of Rothes (13 July 1877 – 29 March 1927), and had issue.
 Malcolm George Dyer-Edwardes Leslie, 20th Earl of Rothes (8 February 1902 – 1975) whose son Ian succeeded him as 21st Earl of Rothes (10 May 1932 – 15 April 2005), and whose grandson James (b. 1958) is the present 22nd Earl of Rothes. The heir presumptive is the Earl's brother Hon. Alexander John Leslie (b. 1962). 
 Hon. John Wayland Leslie (1909–1991)
Noel Leslie, Countess of Rothes, married 2ndly 22 December 1927, to Colonel Claud Macfie, DSO; they had no issue. The Countess retained her title after marriage, according to Scottish peerage law.
By second husband (married 10 August 1865)
 Lilian Drummond Sale Barker
 Cecilia Emala A Drummond Sale Barker, who married in the first quarter of 1900.
(Horace James) Maurice Drummond-Sale-Barker, possibly the same as Horatio Drummond Sale Barker; he was father of
 Audrey Durell Drummond-Sale-Barker or "Wendy" Drummond-Sale-Barker (1903 – 21 December 1994, a woman pilot who was honoured with a medal for being a Spitfire ferry pilot. She was the wife since 6 August 1949 of George Nigel Douglas-Hamilton, 10th Earl of Selkirk (1905–1994). They had no issue.

References

Attribution

External links

 
 Elizabeth Lee, Lucy Elizabeth Drummond Sale- (1841–1892)’, rev. Victoria Millar, first published Sept 2004, 230 words

 ODNB
 

1841 births
1892 deaths
British children's writers
19th-century British women writers
19th-century British writers
British women children's writers